The 1948 Men's European Volleyball Championship was the first edition of the event, organized by Europe's governing volleyball body, the Confédération Européenne de Volleyball. It was hosted in Rome, Italy from September 24 to September 26, 1948.

Teams
The following national teams participated:

Round Robin

Matches 

|}

Final ranking

References
 CEV
 Results

Volleyball Championship
E
V
Men's European Volleyball Championships
VEC 1948 Men
Men's European Volleyball Championship
Men's European Volleyball Championship , 1948
Sports competitions in Rome